Botryllus elegans is a species of colonial ascidian tunicates in the family Styelidae. It is found in Mozambique and South Africa.

References 

 South African Ascidians. Monniot C., Monniot F., Griffiths C. L. and Schleyer M., 2001, Annals of the South African Museum, 108(1), pages 1–141.

External links 

Stolidobranchia
Animals described in 1834
Fauna of Mozambique
Fauna of South Africa
Temperate Southern Africa fauna